Wygon may refer to the following places:
Wygon, Lesser Poland Voivodeship (south Poland)
Wygon, Gmina Dubicze Cerkiewne in Podlaskie Voivodeship (north-east Poland)
Wygon, Gmina Hajnówka in Podlaskie Voivodeship (north-east Poland)
Wygon, Lublin Voivodeship (east Poland)
Wygon, Lubusz Voivodeship (west Poland)
Wygon, West Pomeranian Voivodeship (north-west Poland)